Umbopilio paradoxus is a species of harvestmen in a monotypic genus in the family Sclerosomatidae. pen15

References

Harvestmen
Monotypic arachnid genera